Jan Balet (20 July 1913 in Bremen – 31 January 2009 in Estavayer le Lac,  Switzerland), was a German/US-American painter, graphic artist and illustrator. Affected by the style naive art he worked particularly as a graphic artist and as an Illustrator of children's books. Besides this he painted pictures in the style of naive art. Referred to as a "naïve" painter, his works exhibit a dry wit and refreshingly candid, satirical view of life.

Life

Childhood 
Balet was son of German/Dutch parents. After the divorce of his parents in 1916, he and his mother moved to live with his mother's parents Langenargen at Lake Constance in Germany. His grandfather was the senior judicial counsellor in the area Eduard Eggert and his uncle was the famous painter and illustrator Benno Eggert. Many well-known personalities of the time were friends of his grandfather, i.e. the painters Hans Purrmann, Karl Caspar, Maria Caspar-Filser (cousin of his mother), the writer Martin Andersen Nexo, the Swabian poet Wilhelm Schussen as well as the poet and writer Oskar Wöhrle, Balets godfather. In 1920, his grandfather sold the house in Langenargen and the family moved to Friedrichshafen at Lake Constance.

School time 
In 1920 Balet started school. Because his mother and his grandmother had difficulties bringing him up after the death of his grandfather, in 1926 Balet was sent to boarding school in Germany, Schule Schloss Salem. In 1927 Balet moved to Hansa Home, a strictly catholic institution in Munich and attended grammar school. In order to take up an apprenticeship with a painter shop Balet left school before finishing sixth class. He cut the apprenticeship short, leaving before the end of the second year.

Studies 
In 1929, at the age of 17, he moved to Berlin at the invitation of his father and studied Drawing at the college of Arts and Crafts (Kunstgewerbeschule Ost am Schlesischen Bahnhof). A year later, he went to live with his mother and his grandmother, in Munich.  Balet transferred his studies to the Munich College of Arts but was dismissed in 1932.  He went on to study with Professor Ege, at a private school for commercial art. During this time he also worked at an institute for lithography and for the art gallery Wallach. Balet rented his first small studio at the age of nineteen, where he manufactured and sold hand colored Bavarian woodcuts. 1934 he passed the entrance examination to the Akademie der Bildenden Künste München and undertook further studies with Olaf Gulbransson.

Emigration to the USA 
In early 1938, Balet was recruited by the German military and because his ancestor's passport was not complete, he was forbidden to associate further with the Akademie der Bildenden Künste München. Later that year Balet emigrated to the USA, settled in New York and painted rustic furniture for a living. One winter he jobbed as a skiing teacher in Vermont and occasionally jobbed as an advertising commercial artist. Among other projects, he painted the cafeteria of the largest of New York's department stores R.H. Macy. He married a young woman named Bertha Quinn and in 1940 his son Peter was born. From time to time Balet's designs appeared in the fashion magazine Mademoiselle and in 1943 he became Art Director at the magazine. Balet became so successful as a commercial artist that he was able to give up paid employment and start his own business. He worked for the radio station CBS, magazines such as Vogue, House and Garden, House Beautiful, The Saturday Evening Post, Glamour, Good Housekeeping, This week.  After the war ended in 1945 he acquired U.S. citizenship.  In 1945 Balet and his wife divorced and Peter and his mother went to live with her parents in Ballston Spa, NY.  Balet commuted between his studio in New York and an old, boat house in the dunes of Montauk, Long Island, which he had converted to a studio where he painted and drew. His first children's book Amos and the Moon was published in 1948. Soon after he travelled to Europe to visit his mother and his grandmother in Munich and then spent two months in Paris, which provided great inspiration for his future work. His grandmother died in 1949 at the age of 93 years and Balet said she had been "the most important and dearest person" in his life. Around this time Balet began a relationship with American photo model Lisa Tallal, whom he married a few years later. Balet sold his boat house and purchased his dream house, also on Long Island.  Balet and his wife enjoyed an expensive lifestyle which required him to focus on commercial art. During travels to Europe and Mexico Balet took many photographs, since there was insufficient time for drawing. Despite what was regarded in the USA as fashionable art Abstract, Op-art and Popart Balet continued to paint in his own style. His mother died in 1963 and he inherited the house in Munich. As a former pupil of Olaf Gulbransson, Balet was invited, in 1964, to present an exhibition in the Pavillon Alter Botanischer Garten Munich. Many of his children's books and illustrations were included in the exhibition as well as a variety of his commercial artwork. This encouraged Balet to keep on painting in his special style.

Return to Europe 
In 1965, Balet and his wife Lisa divorced and he returned to Munich where he started to illustrate children's books again, to paint his impressions of his various journeys and to hold exhibitions of his work. In 1973, he settled in the countryside with Claudia (Gerda) C. Foth, in La Landelle in France. Balet enjoyed increasing success with painting and stopped working as a commercial artist. In 1976, Balet received an order from an art dealer to make a number of lithographs annually in Switzerland. Circle Fine Art arranged several exhibitions of these in many different countries. Baletand and his wife, Claudia, moved to Estavayer le Lac on Lake Neuchatel in Switzerland in 1978 so he would not have to travel so far to Zurch to work on his lithographs. Coincidentally, his father's family originally came from this area where Balet is a common family name.

Art work

Own publications (Children books and sketch books) 
 1948 Amos and the moon, Henry Z. Walck Verlag New York
 1949 Ned, Ed and the lion
 1951 What makes an orchestra
 1959 The five Rollatinis, J. B. Lippincott Co. Verlag New York
 1965 Joanjo, Pharos Verlag Basel
 1966 Das Geschenk Eine portugiesische Weihnachtsgeschichte, Betz-Verlag München
 1967 Der König und der Besenbinder, Betz-Verlag München
 1969 Der Zaun, Otto Maier Verlag München
 1969 Ladismaus, Betz-Verlag München
 1979 Ein Skizzenbuch, Windecker Winkelpresse
 1980 Katzen-Skizzen, Windecker Winkelpresse
 1981 Skizzen-Paare, Windecker Winkelpresse
 1981 Die Leihkatze oder Wie man Katzen lieben lernt, Windecker Winkelpresse (Author: Otto Schönberger)
 1982 Paris-Skizzen, Windecker Winkelpresse
 1984 Hellas-Skizzen, Windecker Winkelpresse
 1993 Wasser-Skizzen, Edition Toni Pongratz
 1994 Die Zeppeline des Jan Balet, Zeppelin-Museum Friedrichshafen (Taschenbuch)
 2008 Angekommen: Gedichte (Author: Hans Skupy)

Publicationen, which Jan Balet illustrated 
 1945 Alarcon, P.A.: Tales from the Spanish, Allentown
 1948 Hanle-Zack, D.: The golden ladle, Chicago-New York
 1952 Wing, H.: Rosalinda, Chicago
 1953 Wing, H.: The lazy lion, Chicago
 1954 Jones, P.: Rumpelstiltskin, Chicago
 1955 Jones, P.: Columbine, Chicago
 1956 Jones, P.: Fair, brown and trembling, Chicago
 1957 Bean blossom hill, Chicago
 1958 King, M.B.: The birthday angel, Chicago
 1959 King, M.B.: Papa Pompino, Chicago
 1960 King, M.B.: The snow queen, Chicago
 1960 Doyle, L.: Turkey and ham, New York
 1962 Andersen, H.C.: The princess on the pea and other famous stories, New York
 1963 Dickens, Ch.: The magic fishbone and other famous stories, New York
 1963 Selden, G.: Mice, monks and the Christmas tree, New York
 1964 Rossetti, C.: Adding a poem, New York
 1967 Just one me, Chicago
 1968 Krüss, J.: Ein- Eich & Mondhorn, München
 1986 Schönberger, O.: Die Leihkatze oder wie man Katzen lieben lernt, Frankfurt

Awards and honours 
 1947 Gold Medal, Art Directors Club of New York
 1948 Best of Industry, Direct Mail Award
 1948 Gold Medal, Art Directors Club of New York
 1948 Merit Award, Art Institute of Chicago
 1949 Merit Award, Art Institute of Chicago
 1950 Merit Award, Art Institute of Chicago
 1952 Award, Book Clinic, Chicago
 1954 Merit Award, Art Directors Club of Chicago
 1954 Award for Merit, Art Directors Club of New York
 1954 Certificate of Excellence, American Institute of Graphic Arts, New York
 1956 Award, Book Clinic, Chicago
 1956 Gold Medal, Art Directors Club of New York
 1956 Gold Medal, Art Directors Club of Detroit
 1956 Silver Medal, Art Directors Club of Detroit
 1957 Certificate of Excellence, Society of Typographic Arts, Chicago
 1957 Certificate of Merit, Art Directors Club of New York
 1958 Certificate of Excellence, Society of Typographic Arts, Chicago
 1959 Certificate of Excellence, Society of Typographic Arts, Chicago
 1959 Citation for Merit, Society of Illustrators, New York
 1960 Citation for Merit, Society of Illustrators, New York
 1960 Award, Book Clinic, Chicago
 1962 Citation for Merit, Society of Illustrators, New York
 1965 Grammy Awards of 1965, Best Album Cover - Classical, Robert M. Jones (art director) & Jan Balet (graphic artist) for Saint-Saens: Carnival of the Animals/Britten: Young Persons Guide to the Orchestra conducted by Arthur Fiedler
 1980 Prix d'honneur, Concours International de la Peinture Naive, Morges/Suisse
 1981 Prix d'argent, Concours International de la Peinture Naive, Morges/Suisse

Exhibitions 
 1964 München, Pavillon Alter Botanischer Garten
 1966 München, Pavillon Alter Botanischer Garten
 1967 Berlin, Kunstamt Tiergarten
 1968 Waiblingen, Rathaus
 1969 Düsseldorf, Galerie Vömel
 1971 Hamburg, Atelier Mensch
 1972 Bremen, Paule-Modersohn-Becker-Haus
 1972 Berlin, Galerie Niebuhr
 1972 München, Pavillon Alter Botanischer Garten
 1972 Düsseldorf, Galerie Vömel
 1973 Hamburg Atelier Mensch
 1974 Zürich Galerie Niggli
 1975 Düsseldorf, Galerie Vömel
 1976 Hamburg, Atelier Mensch
 1976 Paris, FIAC
 1977 Washington, ART Washington
 1977 New York, Studio 53
 1977 Basel, ART 77
 1977 Bologna, Arte Fiera 77
 1977 Knokke, Jacobean Gallery
 1977 München, Galerie Schöninger
 1977 San Francisco, Cory Gallery
 1977 Marblehead, Quadrum Gallery
 1977 Königstein, Galerie Spranger
 1977 Köln, Galerie Orange
 1978 Amsterdam, Galerie Spranger
 1978 Washington, ART Washington
 1978 Basel, ART 78
 1978 Klosters, Galerie 63
 1978 Los Angeles, Upstairs Gallery
 1978 Long Beach, Upstairs Gallery
 1978 Northridge, Upstairs Gallery
 1978 Beverly Hills, Upstairs Gallery
 1978 Orange County, Upstairs Gallery
 1978 San Francisco, Cory Gallery
 1978 Siegburg, Galerie Theisen
 1978 Düsseldorf, Internationaler Kunstmarkst
 1979 Vervier/Belgien, Galerie Keuninckx
 1979 Berlin, Galerie Wölffer
 1979 Basel, ART 78
 1979 München, Galerie Charlotte
 1979 Düsseldorf, Galerie Vömel
 1980 Hamburg, Atelier Mensch
 1980 Morges, Galeris Pro Arte
 1980 Ascona, Galleria Associazione Artisti
 1980 Amsterdam, Galerie Hamer
 1981 Oisterwijk, Galerie de Granzerik
 1981 Cartigny-Genève, Galerie L'Escapade
 1982 Caracas, Galeria Contini
 1982 Basel, Art 82
 1982 Düsseldorf, Galerie Vömel
 1983 Hamburg, Atelier Mensch
 1983 Caracas, Galeria Contini
 1983 Lima, Galeria Trapezio
 1983 Langenargen, Museum
 1984 München, Stadtmuseum
 1985 New York, Circle Gallery
 1986 New York, Jack Gallery
 1987 Brüssel, International Centre of Naive Art
 1988-1991 Boston, Chicago, Dallas, Houston, San Francisco, Miami, Los Angeles
 1992 Tokio, Galerie Naif Tanaka
 1994 Friedrichshafen, Zeppelinmuseum
 1996 Nonnenhorn am Bodensee, Galerie Probst
 1997 Asbach Kreis Passau, Museum Kloster Asbach
 1998 Zürich, Galerie Zum Grauen Wind
 1998 Bern, Galerie Christine Brügger
 1999 Zürich, Galerie Wolfsberg
 1999 Rheinfelden, Haus Salmegg
 2001 Zug, Altstadthaus
 2002 München, Galerie Hell
 2003 Böblingen, Fleischermuseum
 2004 München, Galerie Hell
 2007 Blankenburg, Switzerland, Galerie Hüsy
 2007 Gstaad, Switzerland, Hotel Gstaaderhof
 2008 Worb, Atelier Worb
 2008 Bad Saulgau, Galerie "Die Fähre"

Balet’s works are in permanent museum collections in Europe, including the Städt Museum in Munich, the Regierungspräsidium in Tübingen, the Kunsthalle in Bremen, the  Langenargen Museum at lake Constance, the Bayerische Staatsgemäldesammlungen in Munich and the Fleischer Museum in Böblingen, Germany.

Literature 
 R. Zuck, Naive Malerei, M./W. 1974
 Jan Balet, Gemälde – Zeichnungen – Graphik – Museum Langenargen am Bodensee, 1983
 Nebojsa Tomasevic, World Encyclopaedia of Naive Art, Frederick Muller Ltd, 1984
 O. Bihalji-Merin, Die Naiven der Welt, Eltville 1986
 Die Zeppeline des Jan Balet. Katalog der Ausstellung im Zeppelin-Museum Friedrichshafen 8. Juni 1994 - 31. Juli 1994.
 Marcus, Leonard S.: 75 Years of Children's Book Week Posters: Celebrating Great Illustrators of American Children's Books, New York 1994
 Klaus Doderer, Lexikon der Kinder- und Jugendliteratur, Beltz, 1995

See also
 List of German painters

External links 
 Jan Balet Art Preservation:  http://www.janbalet.com/
 Illustrations by Jan Balet: https://www.flickr.com/photos/leifpeng/sets/1477407/
 Blog about Jan Balet: http://todaysinspiration.blogspot.com/2009/02/jan-balet-1913-2009.html

1913 births
2009 deaths
Artists from Bremen
20th-century German painters
20th-century German male artists
German male painters
21st-century German painters
21st-century German male artists
German graphic designers
German art directors
Alumni of Schule Schloss Salem
German emigrants to the United States